La Fiesta de Santa Barbara is a 1935 American comedy short film directed by Louis Lewyn. It was nominated for an Academy Award at the 9th Academy Awards in 1936 for Best Short Subject (Color). It features a young, pre-stardom 13-year-old Judy Garland singing "La Cucaracha" with her two sisters (billed as "The Garland Sisters").

Summaries
Hollywood stars participate in a Mexican-themed revue and festival in Santa Barbara. Andy Devine, the "World's Greatest Matador", engages in a bullfight with a dubious bovine supplied by Buster Keaton, and musical numbers are provided by Joe Morrison and The Garland Sisters. Comedy bits and dance numbers are also featured.

Cast

 Pete Smith as himself, Narrator (voice)
 Eduardo Durant's Rhumba Band as Themselves 
 The Spanish Troubadors as Themselves
 The Fanchonettes as Themselves
 The Garland Sisters as Themselves 
 Kirby and DeGage as Themselves
 Dude Ranch Wranglers as Themselves
 Warner Baxter as himself
 Chester Conklin as himself
 Mary Carlisle as herself
 Cecilia Parker as herself
 Ralph Forbes as himself
 Shirley Ross as herself
 Rosalind Keith as herself
 Ida Lupino as herself
 Toby Wing as herself
 Edmund Lowe as himself 
 Gilbert Roland as himself
 Binnie Barnes as herself
 Robert Taylor as himself
 Harpo Marx as himself
 Andy Devine as himself 
 Buster Keaton as himself 
 Irvin S. Cobb as himself
 Joe Morrison as himself 
 Maria Gambarelli as herself
 Gary Cooper as himself
 Ted Healy as himself
 Leo Carrillo as himself 
 Adrienne Ames as herself
 Steffi Duna as herself
 Paul Porcasi as himself

References

External links

1935 films
1935 comedy films
1935 short films
Films produced by Pete Smith (film producer)
American comedy short films
1930s English-language films
1930s American films